Min Naing (born 5 December 1963) is a Burmese politician who currently serves as an Amyotha Hluttaw MP for Sagaing Region No. 12 Constituency. He is a member of the National League for Democracy.

Early life and education
Min Naing was born on 5 December 1936 in Leshi Township, Myanmar. He is an ethnic Naga.

Political career
He is a member of the National League for Democracy. In the 2015 Myanmar general election, he was elected as an Amyotha Hluttaw member of parliament and elected representative from Sagaing Region No. 11 parliamentary constituency.

References

National League for Democracy politicians
1963 births
Living people
People from Sagaing Region
Naga people